Nicolae Bunea (born 21 December 1963) is a Moldavian professional football manager and former footballer. Since June 2013 he is the head coach of Moldavian football club FC Zaria Bălți.

References

External links
 Nicolae Bunea at soccerway (as manager)

1963 births
Living people
Soviet footballers
Moldovan footballers
Moldovan football managers
FC Nistru Otaci managers
CSF Bălți managers

Association footballers not categorized by position
Moldovan Super Liga managers